Abukar is both a given name and a surname. Notable people with the name include:

Abukar Arman, Somali political analyst and diplomat
Abukar Hassan Mohamoud (died 2012), Somalian activist
Abukar Umar Adani, Somali politician
Fartun Abukar Omar (born 1986), Somali sprinter
Leila Abukar (born 1974/75), Somali-born Australian activist
Safia Abukar Hussein (born 1981), Somali sprinter